Scolioneura is a genus of sawflies belonging to the family Tenthredinidae.

The species of this genus are found in Europe and Northern America.

Species:
 Scolioneura betuleti (Klug, 1816)
 Scolioneura canadensis Marlatt

References

Tenthredinidae
Sawfly genera